Erich Auerbach (November 9, 1892 – October 13, 1957) was a German philologist and comparative scholar and critic of literature. His best-known work is Mimesis: The Representation of Reality in Western Literature, a history of representation in Western literature from ancient to modern times and frequently cited as a classic in the study of realism in literature. Along with Leo Spitzer, Auerbach is widely recognized as one of the foundational figures of comparative literature.

Biography
Auerbach, who was Jewish and born in Berlin, was trained in the German philological tradition and would eventually become, along with Leo Spitzer, one of its best-known scholars. After participating as a combatant in World War I, he earned a doctorate in 1921 at University of Greifswald, served as librarian at the Prussian State Library for some years, and in 1929 became a member of the philology faculty at the University of Marburg, publishing a well-received study entitled Dante: Poet of the Secular World.

With the rise of National Socialism Auerbach was forced to vacate his position in 1935. Exiled from Nazi Germany, he took up residence in Istanbul, Turkey, where he wrote Mimesis: The Representation of Reality in Western Literature (1946), generally considered his masterwork. He was chair of the faculty for Western languages and literatures at Istanbul University from 1936 to 1947. Auerbach's life and work in Turkey is detailed and placed in historical and sociological context by Kader Konuk, East West Mimesis: Auerbach in Turkey (2010).

He moved to the United States in 1947, teaching at Pennsylvania State University and then working at the Institute for Advanced Study. He was appointed professor of Romance philology at Yale University in 1950, a position he held until his death in 1957 in Wallingford, Connecticut.

While at Yale, Auerbach supervised Fredric Jameson's doctoral work.

Reception
In the fifty year commemoration reprinting of Auerbach's Mimesis, Edward Said of Columbia University included an extended introduction to Auerbach and mentioned the book's debt to Giambattista Vico stating: "As one can immediately judge by its subtitle, Auerbach's book is by far the largest in scope and ambition out of all the other important critical works of the past half century. Its range covers literary masterpieces from Homer and the Old Testament right through to Virginia Woolf and Marcel Proust, although as Auerbach says apologetically at the end of the book, for reasons of space he had to leave out a great deal of medieval literature as well as some crucial modern writers like Pascal and Baudelaire."

Works
 Roman Filolojisine Giriş Istanbul Universitesi Edebiyat Fakultesi: Horoz Yayinevi, 1944.
 Scenes from the Drama of European Literature. New York: Meridian, 1959. Republished 1984 by Manchester University Press. .
 Dante: Poet of the Secular World Trans. Ralph Manheim. New York: NYRB Classics, 1929, 1961, 2007. .
Figura, 1938
 Mimesis: Dargestellte Wirklichkeit in der abendländischen Literatur. Bern: Franke Verlag, 1946.
Published in English as Mimesis: The Representation of Reality in Western Literature. Princeton: Princeton University Press, 1955.
 Literary Language and Its Public in Late Latin Antiquity and in the Middle Ages. Trans. Ralph Manheim. Princeton: Princeton University Press, 1993. .
 Time, History, and Literature: Selected Essays of Erich Auerbach. Ed. James I. Porter. Trans. Jane O. Newman. Princeton University Press, 2013. .

References

Bibliography
 Bakker, Egbert. "Mimesis as Performance: Rereading Auerbach’s First Chapter." Poetics Today 20.1 (1999): 11–26.
 Baldick, Chris. "Realism." Oxford Concise Dictionary of Literary Terms. New York: Oxford University Press, 1996. 184.
 Bremmer, Jan. "Erich Auerbach and His Mimesis." Poetics Today 20.1 (1999): 3–10.
 Calin, William. "Erich Auerbach’s Mimesis – ’Tis Fifty Years Since: A Reassessment." Style 33.3 (1999): 463–474.
 Domínguez, César. "Auerbach y la literatura comparada ante Babel." Cuadernos de teoría y crítica 3 (2017): 137–149.
 Doran, Robert. "Literary History and the Sublime in Erich Auerbach´s Mimesis." New Literary History 38.2 (2007): 353–369.
 Doran, Robert. "Erich Auerbach's Humanism and the Criticism of the Future." Moderna: semestrale di teoria e critica della letteratura 11.1/2 (2009): 31–39.
 Green, Geoffrey. "Erich Auerbach." Literary Criticism & the Structures of History: Erich Auerbach & Leo Spitzer. Nebraska: University of Nebraska Press, 1982.
 Holmes, Jonathan, and Streete, Adrian, eds. Refiguring Mimesis: Representation in Early Modern Literature. Hatfield: University of Hertfordshire Press, 2005.
 Holquist, Michael. "Erich Auerbach and the Fate of Philology Today." Poetics Today 20.1 (1999): 77–91.
 Landauer, Carl. "Mimesis and Erich Auerbach’s Self-Mythologizing." German Studies Review 11.1 (1988): 83–96.
 Lerer, Seth, Literary History and the Challenge of Philology: The Legacy of Erich Auerbach. Stanford: Stanford University Press, 1996.

 Nuttall, A. D. "New Impressions V: Auerbach’s Mimesis." Essays in Criticism 54.1 (2004): 60–74.
 Porter, James I. "Erich Auerbach and the Judaizing of Philology." Critical Inquiry 35 (2008): 115–47.
 Said, Edward. "Fifty Year Anniversary of Mimesis," included in Fifty Year Anniversary edition of Mimesis.  Princeton University Press, 2003.

External links

 
 Rousseau Hakkinda Bir Baslangic Yazisi by Erich Auerbach, Editor by Beyaz Arif Akbas, Yalnizgoz Books, Edirne 2011 

1892 births
1957 deaths
Jewish emigrants from Nazi Germany to the United States
German philologists
Jewish American scientists
Jewish philosophers
German literary critics
Institute for Advanced Study visiting scholars
Writers from Berlin
People from Wallingford, Connecticut
Academic staff of the University of Marburg
University of Greifswald alumni
Pennsylvania State University faculty
Yale University faculty
Academic staff of Istanbul University
German literary theorists
Comparative literature academics
American people of German-Jewish descent
German expatriates in Turkey
Französisches Gymnasium Berlin alumni
German male non-fiction writers
Yale Sterling Professors
20th-century philologists
20th-century American Jews